"Valentine's Day" is a song by Nigerian R&B singer Faze released as the 7th single from his platinum Originality  album.
The single was released in December to commemorate the Valentine's Day  celebration in 2009.

Song structure
"Valentine's Day" is a R&B song with pop undertones set in the key of F major. It moves at 104 bpm and is set in  time. The album version runs for four minutes and seven seconds. 
The song refers to a scene of lover's celebrating their Valentine's Day. As well as, remind the listener of the Joy of the Valentine's Day celebration and its importance.
"Valentine's Day" is constructed in the common verse-chorus-bridge song pattern. It employs kick and snare drum sounds which is audible throughout the song. Synthesized strings are also prominent throughout the song.
The song employs an increasing but yet increasing bridge vocals from the artiste after much melo laid-back style delivered verses.

Release
"Valentine's Day" was released to radio stations in December 2008 as the seventh single from the much anticipated album Originality (it went on to be tag 'The Most Anticipated Album of the Year 2008'). The single was released through his personal record label Independent Entertainment, produced by Spenkie. It's been gaining a lot of air-play rotation since its release and is one of the best written love songs of 2008 in Nigeria.

Reception

Valentine's Day is a well received song by critics and fans alike and is referenced as one of the best songs in the album as well, One of the best love songs of 2008. It's been on an average rotation since then on radio.

References
Faze-Originality album "Stepping up the game", Vanguard News. Retrieved on 28-9-2008.
Lolade Sowoolu 'Faze Premiere's Originality', Vanguard News. Retrieved on 12-9-2008.
Faze launches Originality album, October 6. 
Faze- King of R&B tops charts again with Originality, Vanguard News. Retrieved on 13-12-2008.

External links
Mynaijanews 
Naijapals 
Allafrica 

2008 singles
Faze (musician) songs
Songs written by Faze (musician)
2008 songs